The 1879 Prince Edward Island election was held on 4 February 1879 to elect members of the House of Assembly of the province of Prince Edward Island, Canada. It was won by the Conservative party.

References
 

Elections in Prince Edward Island
1879 elections in Canada
1879 in Prince Edward Island
February 1879 events